Muhammad Emin Er (c. 1914 – 27 June 2013) was an Islamic scholar trained in the Ottoman tradition and former student of Bediüzzaman  Said Nursi. He was born in the Ottoman province of Diyarbakır and his family belonged to a Kurdish tribe called Miran.

Emin Er has published a large number of books in Arabic, focusing on the basic disciplines within Arabic linguistics (such as morphology, syntax, and logic), as well as more advanced disciplines (such as Islamic law, especially in relation to spiritual psychology, or Sufism).  He has stated that a major goal of his scholarship is to adapt the traditional religious sciences of Islam to present-day needs and concerns.

Emin Er is known for statements concerning the compatibility of Islamic thought with the teachings of the Judeo-Christian tradition, in particular that the rigorous emulation of the life of Muhammad necessarily leads the believer to the emulation of Jesus and Moses.

References 

Year of birth uncertain
2013 deaths
20th-century Muslim scholars of Islam
Kurdish scholars
Kurdish Arabists